The 1932 Catalan regional election was held on Sunday, 20 November 1932, to elect the first legislature of the Parliament of the autonomous region of Catalonia.

It was the sole Catalan parliamentary election held during the Second Spanish Republic (1931-1939). Between 1939 and 1980 the Parliament, as the rest of the institutions of the Generalitat of Catalonia, remained in exile as a consequence of the Republican defeat in the Spanish Civil War, and there wasn't another election until 1980.

All 85 seats in the Parliament were up for election. The Republican Left of Catalonia (ERC), led by the acting President of the Generalitat of Catalonia, Francesc Macià, was the winning party. the conservative Regionalist League, almost hegemonic in Catalonia during the reign of Alfonso XIII, reached the second place but far from the Republican Left. The third list was the Republican Catalanist Party, which won one seat.

External links
 Article about the Catalonia Parliament of 1932
 1932 Parliament of Catalonia election in Historia Electoral

Regional elections in Catalonia
1932 in Catalonia